Uladzimir Zhuraw (born 9 March 1991) is a Belarusian professional football player currently playing for Dnepr Mogilev.

External links

1991 births
Living people
People from Mogilev
Sportspeople from Mogilev Region
Belarusian footballers
Association football goalkeepers
FC Dnepr Mogilev players
FC Polotsk players
FC Naftan Novopolotsk players
FC Neman Grodno players
FC Vitebsk players